Wan Jianhui also written as Wan Jianghui (original name: 萬 建輝, born ) is a Chinese male weightlifter, competing in the 69 kg category and representing China at international competitions. He participated at the 1996 Summer Olympics in the 70 kg event and at the 2000 Summer Olympics in the 69 kg event. He competed at world championships, most recently at the 1999 World Weightlifting Championships.

He set one lightweight snatch world record.

Major results
 - 1998 Asian Games Lightweight class.

References

External links
 

1975 births
Living people
Chinese male weightlifters
Weightlifters at the 1996 Summer Olympics
Weightlifters at the 2000 Summer Olympics
Weightlifters at the 1998 Asian Games
Medalists at the 1998 Asian Games
Asian Games silver medalists for China
Asian Games medalists in weightlifting
Olympic weightlifters of China
Place of birth missing (living people)
World Weightlifting Championships medalists
20th-century Chinese people